Grant Larson (June 2, 1933 – September 11, 2020) was an American politician who served in the Wyoming Senate from the 17th district from 1995 to 2011.

Larson was born in Provo, Utah and went to the University of Utah. Laron served in the United States Air Force. He was a business owner in Jackson, Wyoming. Larson served on the Teton County Commission. He died on September 11, 2020, in Jackson, Wyoming at age 87.

References

1933 births
2020 deaths
Businesspeople from Wyoming
County commissioners in Wyoming
People from Jackson, Wyoming
Politicians from Provo, Utah
Military personnel from Utah
University of Utah alumni
Republican Party Wyoming state senators